Lukáš Rosol was the defending champion; however, he didn't participate this year.
Stéphane Robert won in the final 7–6(5), 7–6(5), against Jiří Vaněk.

Seeds

Draw

Final four

Top half

Bottom half

References
 Main Draw
 Qualifying Draw

Kosice Open - Singles
2009 Singles